Julián Alejo López (born 8 January 2000) is an Argentine professional footballer who plays as a midfielder for Defensa y Justicia, on loan from Racing Club.

Career

Club
López began his career in the system of Racing Club. He first experienced first-team football in October 2018, with manager Eduardo Coudet selecting him as a substitute for an Argentine Primera División match against Boca Juniors. Racing Club drew the match 2–2, with López coming on for the final minutes in place of Marcelo Díaz. On 16 February 2022, López joined Primera Nacional club Ferro Carril Oeste on a one-year loan deal. However, the spell at Ferro was cut short and on 29 June 2022, he was instead loaned out to Defensa y Justicia until the end of 2023 with a purchase option set at 700 thousand dollars for 50% of the pass.

International
López has represented Argentina at U20 level, notably scoring against Ecuador in a friendly on 15 October 2018. January 2019 saw López receive a call-up to the South American U-20 Championship in Chile, as an injury replacement for Agustín Almendra.

Career statistics
.

References

External links

2000 births
Living people
Sportspeople from Avellaneda
Argentine footballers
Argentina youth international footballers
Argentina under-20 international footballers
Association football midfielders
Primera Nacional players
Argentine Primera División players
Racing Club de Avellaneda footballers
Ferro Carril Oeste footballers
Defensa y Justicia footballers